Hyposmocoma ferruginea is a species of moth of the family Cosmopterigidae. It was first described by Otto Swezey in 1915. It is endemic to the Hawaiian island of Oahu. The type locality is Mount Olympus.

The larvae feed on Cheirodendron species. The whitish larvae bore in dead twigs and branches.

Swezey described the pupa as follows:

External links

ferruginea
Endemic moths of Hawaii
Moths described in 1915